Col. Mohamed Ahmed Alin is a Somali politician, former military leader and former president of semi-autonomous Galmudug State of Somalia.

Biography
Alin was a colonel in the former Somali Military. He later entered a career in politics, participating in the regional elections of the Galmudug state in central Somalia. The elections took place in Galkacyo, the capital of Galmudug, and Alin came out victorious, making him the second president of the region. Sultans and religious leaders were also reportedly on hand to congratulate him on his election victory. Alin's term as President of Galmudug was scheduled for three years.

References

Living people
Presidents of Galmudug
Somalian military leaders
Year of birth missing (living people)